Ziad Doueiri (born October 7, 1963) is a Lebanese film director, cinematographer and writer. He is best known for his award-winning films West Beirut (1998) and The Insult (2017), a film that was nominated at the 90th Academy Awards, representing Lebanon in the Best International Feature Film category.

Personal life and career
Ziad Doueiri was born in Beirut in 1963 and grew up there during the civil war, where he shot his personal films with an 8 mm camera. At the age of 20, he left Lebanon during the Civil War to go study in the United States, and graduated in 1986 from San Diego State University with a degree in cinema, then worked with Quentin Tarantino as camera assistant then cinematographer for movies such as Jackie Brown, From Dusk Till Dawn, Pulp Fiction, and Reservoir Dogs.

In 1998 Ziad Doueiri wrote and directed his first feature film West Beirut, which received international fame, which starrs his brother Rami Doueiri. The film was followed by Lila Says, which was shown at the Sundance Film Festival.

Doueiri worked between Los Angeles and Beirut until 2011 after which he returned to work from Beirut.

Doueiri directed his film The Attack in 2013, which caused controversy and was banned from showing in Lebanon and most Arab countries (except for Morocco and Dubai) because of the scenes that he filmed in Tel Aviv. Doueiri  expressed opposition to boycotts of Israel, and in 2013 defended his decision to shoot a film in Israel featuring Israeli actors. The film is based on the story of Yasmina Khadra, with the same title. Its production costed 1.5 million dollars, with French and Egyptian funding and the Doha Film Institute. In September 2017, he was questioned in Beirut after returning from the Venice Film Festival.

His next film, "Foreign Affairs," in which he was assigned the title role of French actor Gérard Depardieu, is about a retired French diplomat who is secretly sent by the American government to negotiate an agreement between Israel and the Palestine Liberation Organization on the Gaza Strip and the West Bank. His new movies are "Case No. 23" or The Insult.

Douiri resides in Paris.

Filmography

References

External links
 Interview with Ziad Doueiri in Salon 1999-09-09. Retrieved 2010-08-25
 
 
 
 

1963 births
Lebanese film directors
Lebanese writers
Living people
San Diego State University alumni